Convent of the Sacred Heart is an American independent Roman Catholic all-girls' school in the Manhattan borough of New York City.

Teaching from pre-kindergarten through twelfth grade, it is located on Manhattan's Upper East Side at East 91st Street and Fifth Avenue.

The school is housed in the former Otto H. Kahn House and James A. Burden House, both of which are New York City-Designated Landmarks, and are listed on the National Register of Historic Places.

History

Founded in 1881 by the Society of the Sacred Heart, a Roman Catholic congregation established in France in 1800, the school is one of New York City's oldest private schools for girls.

The school was originally housed in a Manhattan brownstone on Madison Avenue at East 54th Street.

By the 1930s, the school had outgrown its Madison Avenue space and moved into the Otto H. Kahn House.  In 1940, the society acquired the James A. Burden House next door.

Membership and accreditation

In addition to being a member of the Society of the Sacred Heart and a part of the global Network of Sacred Heart Schools, a worldwide network of over 150 schools committed to the mission of a Sacred Heart education, the school is accredited by the New York State Association of Independent Schools and is a member of the National Association of Independent Schools.

It is operated independently as part of the Network of Sacred Heart Schools. The school is also associated with the New York Interschool Association.

The school is also a member of the Independent Schools Association of Greater New York, the National Coalition of Girls’ Schools, the European Council of International Schools, the International Schools Association and the Network of Sacred Heart Schools in the United States.

Facilities

The school is located in two historic mansions in the Carnegie Hill Historic District on the Upper East Side of Manhattan, at 1 East 91st Street and 7 East 91st Street, next to Central Park/Fifth Avenue and across the street from the Cooper-Hewitt Museum.
 1 East 91st Street (Otto H. Kahn House) houses grade 5 through grade 12 (opened in 1934)
 7 East 91st Street (James A. Burden House) houses pre-kindergarten through grade 4 (opened in 1940)

In September 2008, the school  purchased a facility located at 406 East 91st Street and created a new sports center. As of September 2014, the athletic center was open.

Within the buildings at 1 East 91st Street and 7 East 91st Street, there are:
 four science labs
 two gymnasiums
 one performance space
 two photography darkroom studios
 two rooftop playgrounds
 interactive projectors in all classrooms for grades K–12
 two libraries and virtual library access
 wireless Internet access

Clubs and common-interest organizations

The school offers a range of clubs and activities for student participation, including Amnesty International, the Habitat for Humanity International, forensics (public speaking) and student council.
 There are 40+ after-school activities available to Lower School students.
 There are 40+ clubs and activities available to Middle School students.
 There are 30+ clubs and activities available to Upper School students.

Over 40 percent of the sophomore class study abroad on exchange for three to ten weeks to other schools in the Sacred Heart network, including schools in France and in Spain for ten weeks, and to Australia, Canada, Ireland, Italy,  and Taiwan for three weeks.

Athletics

The school participates in eleven interscholastic sports disciplines.

There is a separate athletic building at 406 91st Street near First Avenue.

Enrollment, tuition and fees
Tuition and payment for the 2017-2018 school year:
 Pre-kindergarten: $27,870
 Junior kindergarten: $39,780
 Kindergarten – Grade 12 : $48,700
 Average enrollment of students in pre-kindergarten through grade 12: 685
 The Lower School includes pre-kindergarten, junior kindergarten, kindergarten and grades 1 through 4
 The Middle School consists of grades 5 through 8
 The Upper School is made up of grades 9 through 12
 Students of color: 28 percent
 Average grade size (K–12): 50
 Student–faculty ratio: 7:1

Notable alumnae

 Karen Akers – actress and singer
 Hasan Piker – political commentator and gamer 
 Edith Bouvier Beale –  socialite, fashion model and cabaret performer
 Lourdes Benedicto – actress
 Jordana Brewster – actress and model
 Dorothy Donnelly – actress and playwright
 Natali Germanotta – fashion designer and stylist
 Stefani Germanotta – singer, songwriter, actress and activist known as Lady Gaga
 Caroline Kennedy – attorney and diplomat
 Ethel Skakel Kennedy – human-rights activist
 Joan Bennett Kennedy –  socialite
 Susan Konig – author and publisher
 Leah McSweeney – fashion designer
 Christa Miller – actress
 Minnie Mortimer – socialite
 Lia Neal – Olympic swimmer and medalist

 Emily Rafferty – president emeritus, Metropolitan Museum of Art
 Nicky Hilton Rothschild – heiress and socialite
 Emily Rutherfurd – actress
 Eunice Kennedy Shriver – human-rights activist
 Alix Smith – photographer
 Jean Kennedy Smith – diplomat
 Frederica von Stade – singer
 Elaine Stritch – actress and singer
 Gloria Morgan Vanderbilt –  socialite
 Harriet Sylvia Ann Howland Green Wilks – socialite and heiress
 Anne Elizabeth Wilson – writer, poet, editor and pet cemetery owner
 Charlotte Selina Wood –  actress

In popular culture

Film and theatre

 The Dark Corner (1946) – Burden Mansion, 7 East 91st Street, as The Cathcart Gallery
 The Anderson Tapes (1971)
 9 to 5 (1980)
 Chicago (play –  1975; film – 2002) – in the song "We Both Reached for the Gun" the character, Roxie Hart, was said to have attended the school
 The Verdict (1982)
 Working Girl (1988)
 A Perfect Murder (1998)
 Uptown Girls (2003)
 Night at the Museum (2006) – appears briefly towards the beginning of the film when Nick's teacher is putting up a sign for career day
 Falling for Grace (2006)
 Nick and Norah's Infinite Playlist (2008) –  titular character Norah attends the school
 Duplicity (2009)

Literature and television

 A Very Gaga Thanksgiving (2011)
 Cashmere Mafia (Season 1)
 Gossip Girl (book series) – contains the line "two little Sacred Heart girls in their cute red and white checked pinafores were walking an enormous black Rottweiler" on page 86 in the first novel of the series
 Law & Order
 Madam Secretary 
 Scrubs – Sacred Heart Hospital, where the series takes place, was named after the Convent of the Sacred Heart, where cast member (and wife of the series' screenwriter Bill Lawrence) Christa Miller (who portrays Jordan Sullivan) attended high school
 White Collar

References

External links 

 cshnyc.org, Convent of the Sacred Heart, official website
 sofie.org, Network of Sacred Heart Schools, official website
 aashnet.org The Associated Alumnae and Alumni of the Sacred Heart,  official website

1881 establishments in New York (state)
Buildings and structures on the National Register of Historic Places in Manhattan
Educational institutions established in 1881
Girls' schools in New York City
Private K-12 schools in Manhattan
Roman Catholic elementary schools in Manhattan
Roman Catholic secondary schools in Manhattan
Sacred Heart schools in the United States
Upper East Side